"Second Bite of the Apple" is the first single released from British band Beady Eye's second album, BE. "Second Bite of the Apple" was released along with B-side "Dreaming of Some Space" which used backmasking.

To promote the song Beady Eye performed 'Second Bite of the Apple' on the semi-final of the BBC talent show The Voice UK on 15 June 2013.

Track listing
"Second Bite of the Apple" (Gem Archer) – 3:29
"Dreaming of Some Space" (Andy Bell) - 1:56

Chart performance

As of 9 June 2013, "Second Bite of the Apple" had peaked at number 112 on the UK Singles Chart.

References

Songs written by Gem Archer
Beady Eye songs
2013 singles